David Grover Stacey Wingate, Jr. (born December 15, 1963) is an American former professional basketball player. The shooting guard-small forward spent 15 years in the National Basketball Association (NBA) with six teams.

High school and college career
Wingate played high school basketball for the Dunbar Poets of Dunbar High School, where he played alongside fellow NBA players Muggsy Bogues, Reggie Lewis, and Reggie Williams. The 1981–82 Poets finished the season at 29–0, and the following year, after Wingate's graduation, finished 31–0 and were ranked first in the nation by USA Today. At the end of his senior season, it was expected Wingate would attend the University of Maryland, but instead he decided to attend Georgetown University.

As a freshman for the Georgetown Hoyas men's basketball team during the 1982–83 season, Wingate was named to the Big East Conference all-rookie team. The following season, he made the transition from a guard-forward hybrid to playing primarily at the shooting guard position, as the small forward position was filled be incoming freshman and fellow Dunbar alum Reggie Williams. During his sophomore year, Wingate led the team in steals and scored about 11 points per game, en route to Georgetown winning the 1984 NCAA Men's Division I Basketball Tournament. Wingate's junior season saw Georgetown miss repeating as national champions, losing to Villanova University in the final of the 1985 NCAA Men's Division I Basketball Tournament. It also was one of Wingate's best defensive seasons, earning career-high totals in assists and steals, and leading the team with 16 points in their championship match-up against Villanova. He averaged 16 points a game in his senior year, trailing only Williams, and played 1,000 minutes without fouling out. Upon graduation, Wingate was the Hoyas' third all-time leading scorer behind Eric Floyd and Patrick Ewing.

Professional career
Wingate had a 15-year NBA career spanning from 1986 to 2001. He was selected in the second round with the 44th pick of the 1986 NBA draft by the Philadelphia 76ers. His selection in the second round surprised some, with 76ers coach Matt Guokas saying, "In a lot of people's eyes, he was a first-round pick" and that he was "one of the people we would have considered" had they not traded their first-round pick. After fighting for a spot on the 76ers roster, Wingate made his debut on November 2, 1986. He played nine minutes in his debut against the Atlanta Hawks, and made his first start against the Cleveland Cavaliers on March 10, 1987, scoring 22 points in 46 minutes. He finished the season having played in 77 games, averaging two assists and 8.8 points per game.

He played for the San Antonio Spurs, Washington Bullets, Charlotte Hornets, Seattle SuperSonics and New York Knicks. Wingate retired with the Sonics in 2001, after having played a total of 28 games in his final three NBA seasons.

Personal life
Wingate has five children: Cynthia Alixandra, Brandi Allstin, Davion, Ashley and Ameenah.

Notes

External links
 NBA.com player profile

1963 births
Living people
African-American basketball players
American men's basketball players
Basketball players from Baltimore
Charlotte Hornets players
Georgetown Hoyas men's basketball players
New York Knicks players
Parade High School All-Americans (boys' basketball)
Philadelphia 76ers draft picks
Philadelphia 76ers players
San Antonio Spurs players
Seattle SuperSonics players
Shooting guards
Small forwards
Washington Bullets players
21st-century African-American people
20th-century African-American sportspeople